Nonstop is the seventh album recorded by BYU Vocal Point, recorded in 2008.

Track listing

References

2008 albums